Theodor Dorsten (Latin:Theodoricus Dorstenius) (Dorsten, 1492-Kassel, 18 May 1552) was a German botanist and physician.

16th-century German botanists
16th-century German physicians
1492 births
1552 deaths
16th-century male writers